Rutherglen and Hamilton West is a burgh constituency of the House of Commons of the Parliament of the United Kingdom, which was created for the 2005 general election. It covers almost all of the former constituency of Glasgow Rutherglen and most of the former constituency of Hamilton South, and it elects one Member of Parliament (MP) by the first-past-the-post system of election. The current MP is Margaret Ferrier, an independent, who won the seat at the 2019 snap general election. She had previously held the seat from 2015 to 2017. Ferrier was previously a Scottish National Party MP until the whip was withdrawn on 1 October 2020 after an incident relating to a breach of the COVID-19 pandemic regulations.

Boundaries

The Rutherglen and Hamilton West constituency covers part of the South Lanarkshire council area. The rest of the council area is covered by the Dumfriesshire, Clydesdale and Tweeddale, East Kilbride, Strathaven and Lesmahagow and Lanark and Hamilton East constituencies. The Dumfriesshire, Clydesdale and Tweeddale constituency also covers part of the Dumfries and Galloway council area and part of the Scottish Borders council area.

The terms of the Rutherglen and Hamilton West name refer to the town of Rutherglen and the west of the town of Hamilton.

The constituency is composed of the electoral wards:

In full: Blantyre, Cambuslang East, Cambuslang West, Rutherglen Central and North, Rutherglen South.
In part: Hamilton North and East, Hamilton South, Hamilton West and Earnock.

Constituency profile
The seat contains commuter areas into the city of Glasgow, with train travel times as short as 15 minutes away from the city centre. Like much of Greater Glasgow, the constituency contains a diverse range of economic profiles including some areas with high levels of deprivation. The seat itself contains a slightly higher than average proportion of Remain voters at 62% and an average amount of No to Independence voters at 55%, making the seat an important Scottish bellwether. Historically dominated by Labour, Margaret Ferrier of the SNP gained the seat for the party for the first time in 2015 and regained it in 2019 with an increased majority. The Conservatives have also made some inroads in the more prosperous areas within the seat, but not to the same level as the neighbouring constituency Lanark and Hamilton East.

Members of Parliament

Elections

Elections in the 2010s

Elections in the 2000s

References 
Specific

General

Westminster Parliamentary constituencies in Scotland
Rutherglen
Cambuslang
Blantyre, South Lanarkshire
Constituencies of the Parliament of the United Kingdom established in 2005
Hamilton, South Lanarkshire
Politics of South Lanarkshire